The 2016–17 Northeastern Huskies women's basketball team represents the Northeastern University during the 2016–17 NCAA Division I women's basketball season. The Huskies, led by third year head coach Kelly Cole, play their home games at the Cabot Center and were members of the Colonial Athletic Association (CAA). They finished the season 12–19, 8–10 CAA play to finish in sixth place. They lost in the quarterfinals of the CAA women's tournament to Drexel.

Roster

Schedule

|-
! colspan="9" style="background:#c00; color:#000;"| Non-conference regular season

|-
! colspan="9" style="background:#c00; color:#000;"| CAA regular season

|-
! colspan="9" style="background:#c00; color:#000;"| CAA Women's Tournament

See also
2016–17 Northeastern Huskies men's basketball team

References

Northeastern Huskies women's basketball seasons
Northeastern